American Pregnancy Association is a non-profit organization that is working to improve reproductive wellness through education. It is based in Irving, Texas, U.S.

History
American Pregnancy Association was founded in 1995 as America's Pregnancy Helpline by Mike and Annie Shaeffer.

Between 1995 and 2003, it worked as a helpline that provided information internationally to about 147,000 women and families.

In 2003, it was converted into a non-profit organization, named American Pregnancy Association. In addition, the organization operate an active website that provides information related to pregnancy and reproduction.

The group has been labeled as an anti-abortion group by reporters and activists.

References

Non-profit organizations based in Texas
Anti-abortion organizations in the United States